Mark Edward Petersen (November 7, 1900 – January 11, 1984) was an American news editor and religious leader. He was born  in Salt Lake City, Utah. He served as a member of the Quorum of the Twelve Apostles  of the Church of Jesus Christ of Latter-day Saints (LDS Church) from 1944 until his death. He became managing editor of the church-owned Deseret News in 1935 and then editor in 1941. He filled the vacancy in the Quorum caused by the excommunication of Richard R. Lyman.

Early life
As a young boy, Petersen was a newspaper carrier, and he also helped in his father’s construction business. Later, he attended the University of Utah and served a mission for the LDS Church in Nova Scotia. In pursuing a career, he became a reporter for the Deseret News and continued working for the paper for sixty years, advancing to the position of president and chairman of the board. Petersen wrote numerous editorials and published more than forty books and many pamphlets used in the church's missionary effort.

LDS Church service
In April 1944, while serving as general manager of the Deseret News, Petersen was called to be a member of the Quorum of the Twelve Apostles. In his calling as an apostle, he directed the church’s public information programs and served on the Military Relations Committee. He was an adviser to the church's Relief Society, Indian Affairs Committee, and Music Committee. He served as president of the West European Mission for more than six years. Petersen was also involved in many community affairs. He was closely associated with the Boy Scouts of America and was a recipient of the Silver Antelope Award. In 1959, in response to a rash of arrests of gay men in Utah and Idaho, church president David O. McKay assigned apostles Spencer W. Kimball and Petersen to work on curing gays within the church.

Controversial teachings
At Brigham Young University on 27 August 1954, at the Convention of Teachers of Religion on the College Level, Petersen delivered the speech, "Race Problems—As They Affect the Church". The speech outlined the religious underpinnings of racial segregation and supported its continued practice as it related to intermarriage between blacks and whites. Particularly, he reaffirmed the LDS Church's unofficial but prevalent teaching at that time that those with dark skin had been less valiant in their lives before coming to earth. He also reiterated the idea that blacks were to be servants to righteous white people after the resurrection, as was the case with Jane Manning James who was sealed to Joseph Smith to be his servant in the next life. Petersen said:

In spite of all he did in the pre-existent life, the Lord is willing, if the Negro accepts the gospel with real, sincere faith, and is really converted, to give him the blessings of baptism and the gift of the Holy Ghost. If that Negro is faithful all his days, he can and will enter the celestial kingdom. He will go there as a servant, but he will get a celestial resurrection. He will get a place in the celestial glory.

In the 1940s, Petersen coined the term "Mormon fundamentalist" to describe people who had left the LDS Church to practice plural marriage.

Death
Petersen died from longstanding complications of cancer after entering Cottonwood Hospital in Murray, Utah, and undergoing surgery. He was buried at Salt Lake City Cemetery.

Publications 

------ (1953). Your Faith and You. Salt Lake City, Utah: Bookcraft.
------ (1953). An apostle speaks to youth about... The Sacredness of Sex - Chastity in Its Holy Mission. Provo, Utah: Brigham Young University.

------ (1959). Teen Dating and Marriage. Salt Lake City, Utah: Deseret Book

References

Further reading

External links
General Authorities and General Officers: Elder Mark E. Petersen

1900 births
1984 deaths
American general authorities (LDS Church)
American Latter Day Saint writers
Deaths from cancer in Utah
Editors of Latter Day Saint publications
Mission presidents (LDS Church)
American Mormon missionaries in Canada
Mormon missionaries in Europe
Writers from Salt Lake City
University of Utah alumni
20th-century Mormon missionaries
Deseret News people
Apostles (LDS Church)
Burials at Salt Lake City Cemetery
20th-century American non-fiction writers
Latter Day Saints from Utah
American white supremacists